Michle is a district of Prague city, part of Prague 4.

Michle is first mentioned in 1185; it has been part of Prague since 1922.

Prague 4